Rimba Ilmu (literally forest of knowledge) is a tropical botanical garden set up by the late Professor W.R. Stanton in 1974 on the campus of the University of Malaya in Kuala Lumpur, Malaysia.

The garden has over 1,600 species of plants occupying over 80 hectares. It is populated mainly with indigenous plants species but include many from tropical Asia, the Pacific islands, Australia, South America, Africa and Madagascar.

The Malaysian Nature Society maintains an environmental program with the cooperation of the university at the botanical garden since 1997.

References

External links
Official website

1974 establishments in Malaysia
Parks in Kuala Lumpur
Botanical gardens in Malaysia